At the End of a Perfect Day is singer Chris de Burgh's third album, released in 1977.

Critical reception
The Irish Times called the album one of de Burgh's "darkest, most bittersweet releases."

Track listing
All compositions by Chris de Burgh
"Broken Wings" – 3:06
"Round and Around" – 3:06
"I Will" – 3:30
"Summer Rain" – 4:00
"Discovery" – 3:21
"Brazil" – 3:13
"In a Country Churchyard (Let Your Love Shine On)" – 3:56
"A Rainy Night in Paris" – 3:21
"If You Really Love Her, Let Her Go" – 4:01
"Perfect Day" – 4:01

Personnel 

 Chris de Burgh – lead vocals, backing vocals (1-7, 9, 10), Spanish guitar solo (1), guitar (2-5, 7, 9, 10), foot tap (2), harpsichord (5), acoustic piano (8)
 Alun Davies – acoustic guitar (1)
 Bryn Haworth – electric and slide guitars (10)
 Dave Markee – bass (1, 3, 4, 5, 7, 10), backing vocals (10)
 Paul Hart – acoustic piano (4, 5, 7, 10)
 The Spiteri Band – acoustic piano, guitars, bass, drums, percussion, flute and backing vocals on "Brazil"
 Jorge Spiteri : Guitar, acoustic piano, backing vocals
 Joseito Romero : Guitar, flute, backing vocals
 José Manuel Arria : Bass guitar
 Bernardo Ball :Drums, percussion 
 Gerry Conway –  drums (1, 3, 4)
 Dave Mattacks – drums (5, 7, 10), percussion (5)
 Barry Morgan –  drums (5), percussion (5)
 Morris Pert (as "Maurice Pert") –  percussion (2)
 Jimmy Jewell – saxophone (2, 8), brass (4)
 John Mumford – brass (4)
 Brian Rogers – string arrangements (3, 5), horn arrangements (5)
 Del Newman – string arrangements (7, 9)
 Paul Samwell-Smith – backing vocals (1, 2, 3, 9, 10)
 Sue Lynch – backing vocals (7)

Production 

 Producer – Paul Samwell-Smith
 Engineer – Mike Bobak
 Assistant Engineer – Nick Cook
 Art Direction – Fabio Nicoli
 Cover Design – Nick Marshall
 Photography – Roger Stowell

Notes

Chris de Burgh albums
1977 albums
Albums produced by Paul Samwell-Smith
A&M Records albums
Albums recorded at Morgan Sound Studios